Tropical Storm Winona may refer to:

In the Eastern Pacific Ocean: 
 Tropical Storm Winona (1989), crossed the International Dateline and moved into the Western Pacific. 

In the Western Pacific Ocean:

 Tropical Storm Winona (1982) (T8208, 08W, Emang)
 Tropical Storm Winona (1985) (T8518, 19W)
 Tropical Storm Winona (1990) (T9012, 15W), struck Japan.
 Tropical Storm Winona (1993) (T9313, 19W, Saling), struck China.

Pacific typhoon set index articles
Pacific hurricane set index articles